Ol Doinyo Lengai is an active volcano in Tanzania. It consists of a volcanic cone with two craters, the northern of which has erupted during historical time. Uniquely for volcanoes on Earth, it has erupted natrocarbonatite, an unusual, cold and highly fluid type of magma. Recent eruptions in 2007-2008 impacted the surrounding region.

Name 

The Maasai and Sonjo people refer to the volcano as "The Mountain of God", viewing it as the abode of the god Engai, who withdrew there after being hit by a hunter with an arrow. Other names are Basanjo, Donjo Ngai, Duenjo Ngai, Mongogogura, Mungogo wa Bogwe and Oldonyo L'Engai.

Geography and geomorphology 

The summit was first explored between 1904 and 1915.  about 300,000 people live in the region, and livestock farming is the most important economic activity although tourism is increasingly important.

The floor of the northern crater is covered with lava flows that resemble pahoehoe lavas. The southern crater is inactive and sometimes filled with water. White volcanic ash deposits cover the slopes of the volcano, which have large fractures on the western flank. There are parasitic vents on Ol Doinyo Lengai's flanks, such as Kirurum Crater on the western, the Nasira cones on the northern, Dorobo crater on the northeastern and Oltatwa Crater on the eastern flank.

There are deposits of past debris avalanches around the volcano, especially on its northern flank; one such event has left a scar on the volcano's flanks. Their occurrence may have been influenced by regional fault systems.

Geology 

Ol Doinyo Lengai is part of the Gregory Rift, which is part of the active East African Rift. The Natron Fault, the western boundary of the Gregory Rift in the area, passes just southwest of the volcano.

The volcano is part of the Ngorongoro volcanic highland, a system of volcanoes that were active from the Miocene to present, and which includes the Ngorongoro and other volcanoes. Over time, volcanic activity shifted northeastward to the present-day Ol Doinyo Lengai. Other volcanoes in the area are Gelai northeast and Ketumbeine southeast of Ol Doinyo Lengai; farther away are the Olduvai Gorge west and Kilimanjaro mountain east of the volcano.

Composition 

Most of the volcanic cone is formed by melilite, nephelinite and phonolite. Ol Doinyo Lengai is the only volcano on Earth known to have erupted carbonatitic lavas during historical times, although these rocks make up only a small fraction of the volcano and only occur in the northern crater; they only recently appeared on the volcano. The properties of Ol Doinyo Lengai's magmas have been used as an analogue for the conditions on carbon planets; these are planets which are rich in carbon.

Chemical composition:
 The carbonatites contain a groundmass of fluorite and sylvite, while apatite, galena, magnetite, monticellite, sellaite and sphalerite form accessory components.
 The silicic lavas contain combeite, ijolites, melanite, nepheline, phlogopite and pyroxene, as well as apatite, garnet, sphene and wollastonite.
 Xenoliths from the basement have been found and consist of gneiss and other metamorphic rocks, as well as ijolites, pyroxenites and urtites.

The carbonatite lavas are rapidly chemically modified by rainfall or covered by deposits condensing from fumarolic gases, yielding secondary minerals like calcite, gaylussite, nahcolite, pirssonite, shortite, thermonatrite and trona, including various chlorides, fluorides and sulfates. These rocks form crusts on the lava flows and within lava tubes. Weathering on the silicic rocks has yielded zeoliths.

The chemical composition of the erupted rocks is not steady, with an increase of silicic magma emplacement noted after 2007-2008, after an episode of increased spreading in the Gregory Rift. The carbonatitic magmas appear to form through the separation of carbon-rich phases; the original magma is variously interpreted to be either nephelinitic or silicic. The phonolites appear to have a separate origin from the other volcanic rocks. There appear to be two magma reservoirs under the volcano, and its plumbing system is complex, involving regional tectonic structures.

Volcanic gases 

Volcanic gas sampled at Ol Doinyo Lengai consists mostly of water and carbon dioxide and originates in the mantle.

Eruption history 

The volcano began erupting between >500,000 to 22,000 years ago. It formed in two stages, a Lengai I consisting of phonolite that forms about 60% of the volume of Ol Doinyo Lengai and crops out in its southern part, and a Lengai II formed by nephelinitic rocks; growth of the volcanic cone was complete about 15,000 years ago, when the Naisiusiu Beds were emplaced in the Olduvai Gorge. The volcano collapsed several times, including once between 850,000-135,000 years ago and another time between 50,000-10,000 years ago. The oldest natrocarbonatite lavas date to 1,250 years before present. An eruption 3,000-2,500 years before present produced a tephra fallout west of Ol Doinyo Lengai, that is presently being eroded by wind and forming dunes including the Shifting Sands of the Olduvai Gorge. A large eruption deposited the Namorod Ash in the gorge, about 1,250 years ago, and another about 600 years ago formed the so-called "Footprint Tuff". Ol Doinyo Lengai is the only presently active volcano of the Gregory Rift.

Records of eruptions go back to the 1880s. The volcano is continually active, but there are seldom observations of its activity. It erupts tephra and lava flows from within the northern crater. The lava flows issue from cones within the crater and form lava ponds and lakes. Explosive eruptions are less common, having been reported in 1917, 1940, 1966, 1983 and 1993. Oversteepened slopes produce landslides and erosion has cut gullies into volcanic deposits. Steam jets have also been observed.

There is evidence of underground magma intrusions. Satellite observations have shown deformation of the volcano during eruptions, and ground-based observations have identified movement in neighbouring fault systems such as the Natron Fault caused by magma originating at Ol Doinyo Lengai.

Recent eruptive period: 1983 and subsequent 

After a phase of quiescence, renewed activity commenced in 1983 and continues with several interruptions to this day. During the 1983 eruption, ashfall occurred at tens of kilometres from the volcano. The emission of a lava flow onto the western flank of Ol Doinyo Lengai in 2006 was accompanied by the formation of a pit crater on the summit.

The explosive activity continued into 2008, when the volcano settled back into the effusion of lava flows; a cinder cone formed in the northern crater during the eruption. Aerosol clouds from the eruption extended over east Africa. The 2007 eruptions forced the evacuation of three villages and disturbed air travel in the touristically important area; livestock fatalities and injuries to people led to requests that the government of Tansania enact access restrictions to the volcano and to increased awareness of the threat formed by the volcano. Wild animals such as flamingos were also impacted by the eruption.

General appearance of lava flows 

Lavas erupted by Ol Doinyo Lengai initially have brown or black colours, but within days to hours become white like snow. More viscous flows containing silicic rocks have also been observed, for example during the 1993 eruption.

Hazards

Potential threats from Ol Doinyo Lengai eruptions are scarcely established. Threats from eruptions at Ol Doinyo Lengai include lahars, landslides, lava flows, pyroclastic flows, volcanic bombs, volcanic gas and volcanic ash fall. Beginning in 2016, the volcano is being monitored by a seismometer and GNSS stations.

Climate and vegetation 

Volcanic ash from Ol Doinyo Lengai influences the surrounding landscape, favouring the growth of nutrient-rich plants. Precipitation falls during two wet seasons in March–May and October–December.

Gallery

See also
 List of volcanoes in Tanzania

Notes

References

Sources

External links 

 
 
 Ol Doinyo Lengai, The Mountain of God 
 

 Ol Doinyo Lengai at nationalgeographic.com
 Ol Doinyo Lengai at Stromboli Online
 Ol Doinyo Lengai at Volcano World
 St Lawrence University Oldoinyo Lengai
 Fred Belton's Ol Doinyo Lengai site
 Ol Doinyo Lengai Photos 2001
 Volcano Discovery Ol Doinyo Lengai volcano, Tanzania
 Video of molten carbonatite lava flow eruptions at Ol Doinyo Lengai volcano

Carbonatite occurrences
Volcanoes of the Great Rift Valley
Stratovolcanoes of Tanzania
Mountains of Tanzania
Active volcanoes
Geography of Arusha Region
Pleistocene stratovolcanoes
Holocene stratovolcanoes